Robert Lee Knous (November 1, 1917 – May 15, 2000) was an American politician who served as the 36th Lieutenant Governor of Colorado from 1959 to 1967 under Stephen McNichols and John Arthur Love.

He was the son of William Lee Knous, who was the 31st Governor of Colorado.

References

1917 births
2000 deaths
Lieutenant Governors of Colorado
20th-century American politicians
Colorado Democrats